The Journal of Family Psychology is a peer-reviewed academic journal published by the American Psychological Association. It was established in 1987 and covers research in family psychology. The current editor-in-chief is Barbara H. Fiese.

The journal has implemented the Transparency and Openness Promotion (TOP) Guidelines.  The TOP Guidelines provide structure to research planning and reporting and aim to make research more transparent, accessible, and reproducible.

Abstracting and indexing 
The journal is abstracted and indexed by MEDLINE/PubMed and the Social Sciences Citation Index. According to the Journal Citation Reports, the journal has a 2020 impact factor of 2.69.

References

External links 
 

American Psychological Association academic journals
English-language journals
Family therapy journals
Bimonthly journals
Publications established in 1987
Psychotherapy journals